Dexippus was a Greek philosopher, a pupil of the Neoplatonist Iamblichus, belonging to the middle of the 4th century AD. He wrote commentaries on Plato and Aristotle, of which one, an explanation and defense of the Aristotelian Categories, is partially extant. In this work Dexippus explains to one Seleucus the Aristotelian Categories, and endeavours at the same time to refute the objections of Plotinus. He also advocated the harmony of the philosophies of Plato and Aristotle.

A Latin edition edited by Félicien was published under the title Quœstionum in Categorias Libri Tres in 1549. The Greek text was published by Leonhard von Spengel in 1859. An English translation by John M. Dillon was published in 1990.

References

Further reading
 

4th-century Romans
4th-century philosophers
Ancient Greek writers
Commentators on Aristotle
Commentators on Plato
Neoplatonists
Ancient Roman philosophers